The Forthing CM7 is an MPV or light commercial, 4-door van produced by Dongfeng Liuzhou Motor under the Forthing or originally the Dongfeng Fengxing sub-brand.

Overview
The CM7 debuted on the 2013 Shanghai Auto Show and was launched in the market later in the same year. The Fengxing CM7 is powered by a Mitsubishi 4G69 2.4 liter inline-4 engine producing 150hp mated to a 5-speed manual gearbox. A variant will also be available with a 2.0 liter turbocharged diesel engine, mated to the same 5-speed manual gearbox. The styling of the body was heavily inspired by the second generation Hyundai Starex with a front DRG design inspired by the second generation Toyota Alphard.

Prices of the Dongfeng Fengxing CM7 ranges from 129,900 yuan to 173,900 yuan in China at launch. Later in the market, the price range was adjusted to a range from 118,900 yuan to 229,900 yuan.

Forthing M7
The Forthing M7 was launched as a 2020 facelift model featuring restyled front and rear ends designed by Pininfarina. The engine powering the Forthing M7 is a 1.8liter turbocharged engine producing 160 hp and 240 N·m. As of October 2020 the 2021 model was introduced with a slight update with the interior features and pricing update.

Forthing Lingzhi Plus
As of October 2020, a variant based on the CM7 called the Forthing Lingzhi Plus was launched. Despite being named Lingzhi, the model is essentially a rebadged 7-seater CM7 and has nothing to do with the Dongfeng Fengxing Lingzhi series. The Forthing Lingzhi Plus is powered by a codenamed DFMB20AQA 2.0 liter naturally aspirated engine producing 133hp and 200 N·m mated to a 6-speed manual gearbox.

Forthing F600

A cheaper trim was also available called the Forthing F600, featuring restyled front and rear DRG designs. A facelift of the Forthing F600 was revealed in 2018 during the 2018 Beijing Auto Show with the design work done by Pininfarina.

References

External links 

 Fengxing M7 Official Website
 Fengxing Lingzhi Plus Official Website

Fengxing CM7
Minivans
Vans
Minibuses
Rear-wheel-drive vehicles
Cars introduced in 2013
Cars of China